Polyacryl Football Club is a defunct  football club that was based in Esfahan, Iran. The team still operates at youth level.

Coaches 
 Hossein Charkhabi (1995–1997)
 Firouz Karimi (1997–98)

Defunct football clubs in Iran
Sport in Isfahan